The 2012–13 A Group was the 89th season of the Bulgarian national top football division, and the 65th of A Group as the top-tier football league in the country. The season began on 11 August 2012 and ended with the last games on 25 May 2013. Ludogorets Razgrad won the A Group title for a second consecutive season, after Levski were leading prior to the last round match, but made a draw with Slavia.

Teams
Vidima-Rakovski, Kaliakra and Svetkavitsa were relegated after finishing in the bottom three places of the table at the end of season 2011–12. Vidima and Kaliakra return to the second tier after two-year spells in the elite, while Svetkavitsa return after just one season in the top tier. 

The relegated teams were replaced by Pirin (Gotse Delchev), champions of West B Group, Etar 1924 (Veliko Tarnovo), champions of East B Group and promotion play-off winners Botev (Plovdiv). Botev returned to A Group after two years of absence, Pirin made their debut on the highest level of Bulgarian football, while Etar 1924 made its debut in the top level, although it’s unofficial predecessor, Etar Veliko Tarnovo played in the top level 14 years ago, season 1997–98.

Stadia and locations
As in the previous year, the league comprised the best thirteen teams of season 2011–12, the champions of the two B Groups and the winners of the promotion play-offs.

Note: Table lists in alphabetical order.

Personnel and sponsoring
Note: Flags indicate national team as has been defined under FIFA eligibility rules. Players and Managers may hold more than one non-FIFA nationality.

League table

Results

Champions
Ludogorets Razgrad

Guela left the club during a season.

Season statistics

Top scorers

Awards

Weekly awards

Player of the Round

Transfers
List of Bulgarian football transfers summer 2012
List of Bulgarian football transfers winter 2012–13

References

First Professional Football League (Bulgaria) seasons
1
Bul